Steve Orlando is an American comic book writer, known for his work for DC Comics writing characters such as Batman, Martian Manhunter, and Wonder Woman, and two series starring Midnighter, which were nominated for a GLAAD Media Award.

Early life
Steve Orlando attended Hamilton College in Clinton, where he studied Russian language and creative writing, obtaining a degree in the latter.

Career
Beginning in 2000, Orlando began attending conventions seeking work in the comics industry. Between 2000 and 2014, with the release of his first longform work, Undertow, he created and revised comics under the mentorship of Man of Action Studios and Vertigo editor Will Dennis, as well as publishing with 215 Ink, Poseur Ink, and working as a submissions editor for Leagues of Talent.

In 2009 and 2014, Orlando was part of the Outlaw Territory Anthology series at Image Comics, Volume 3 of which was nominated for Eisner and Harvey Awards. After releasing shorts for DC/Vertigo's Mystery in Space and CMYK:Yellow Anthologies, he released Undertow at Image Comics in 2014, followed by the original graphic novel Virgil in 2015.

In 2015, Orlando launched Midnighter for DC Comics as part of the DC You publishing initiative, with art by ACO. Midnighter named by io9 as one of the "20 Best Comics of 2015" and "The Best Portrayal of a Gay Superhero in Mainstream Comics." This series was followed by Midnighter and Apollo, celebrated for "...Just [having] the Realest Romantic Relationship in Superhero Comics." Following Midnighter, Orlando was part of the Batman and Robin Eternal weekly event series, before launching both Supergirl and Justice League of America as part of the DC Rebirth initiative.

In 2017 Orlando co-wrote the Batman/Shadow crossover event for DC Comics, followed by writing the sequel Shadow/Batman himself for Dynamite Entertainment. He was part of both the Kamandi Challenge, and Kirby 100 publishing events celebrating the 100th birthday of Jack Kirby.

In 2018, he worked with Gerard Way on the Milk Wars series, a crossover between the DC Universe and the DC Young Animal characters. In June 2018, he and Ryan Sook began writing The Unexpected, as part of the New Age of DC Heroes Publishing initiative.

Also in 2018, Orlando guest-wrote DC's monthly Wonder Woman, Issues 51-55, with Issue 51 named as "one of the best standalone issues of Wonder Woman [the reviewer's] ever read, ever, and it tells a compelling story that speaks directly to the core of a classic and long-tenured character yet is also strikingly-relevant for 2018." and "Wonder Woman #51 is probably one of the best Wonder Woman single issues [the reviewer's] read in a long long time." In June 2019, Orlando returned for Wonder Woman Issue 73. In October 2019, Orlando returned to Wonder Woman, with the departure of G. Willow Wilson. In January 2020, his work with Jesus Merino opened the anniversary 750th issue of Wonder Woman, kicking off the return of classic numbering for the series.

Late 2018 saw the launch of Martian Manhunter, a 12-issue maxiseries and Orlando's third collaboration with Riley Rossmo. Its December-debuting first issue was named as one of 2018's best by Tor Books. Upon release, Forrest Hollingsworth of Adventures in Poor Taste wrote "Martian Manhunter's character redefining debut is a complete and total success - both narratively and artistically it exceeds all expectations and delivers something both alien and welcoming."

Orlando has written for Hello Mr., with a short story illustrated by Sina Grace, in the magazine's first release in comic book format. In 2019, he provided the English Language script for Mirka Andolfo's MERCY live action series trailer.

In September 2022, it was announced Orlando would be writing Scarlet Witch in January 2023, with Sara Pichelli providing the art.

Personal life
Orlando is a bisexual Jew.

Selected bibliography

Marvel Comics
Avengers: Curse of the Man-Thing Vol. 1 #1 (2021)
King in Black: Planet of the SymbiotesVol. 1 #3 (2021)
Spider-Man: Curse of the Man-Thing Vol. 1 #1 (2021)
X-Men: Curse of the Man-Thing Vol. 1 #1 (2021)
Heroes Reborn: Magneto and the Mutant Vol. 1 #1 (2021)
Marauders Annual #1, Vol. 2 #1- (2022–Present)

DC Comics
Mystery In Space Vol. 3 #1 (2012)
Vertigo Quarterly: Yellow (2014)
American Vampire Anthology Vol. 1 #2 (2016)
Aquaman
Aquaman Giant Vol. 1 #1,#3,#4 (2020)
Aquaman Deep Dives Vol. 1 #1,#3,#5-#7 (2020)
Batman
Batman and Robin Eternal #4–5 (with James Tynion IV, Scott Snyder, 2015–2016)
Gotham Academy #18 (2016)
Batman: Night of the Monster Men
Batman Vol. 3 #7–8 (with Tom King, 2016)
Nightwing Vol. 4 #–6 (with Tim Seeley, 2016)
Detective Comics #941–942 (with James Tynion IV, 2016)
Batman Beyond Vol. 6 #12 (with Vita Ayala, 2017)
Batman Annual Vol. 3 #1 (2017)
Batman/The Shadow #1–6 (with Scott Snyder, 2017)
Batman Secret Files Vol. 2 #2 (2019)
Gotham City Monsters #1–6 (2019–2020)
Midnighter
Midnighter Vol. 2 #1–12 (2015–2016)
Midnighter and Apollo #1–6 (2016–2017)
Justice League
Justice League: Darkseid War: Shazam! (2016)
Justice League of America: The Ray Rebirth (2017)
Justice League of America: The Atom Rebirth (2017)
Justice League of America: Vixen Rebirth (with Jody Houser, 2017)
Justice League of America: Killer Frost Rebirth (with Jody Houser, 2017)
Justice League of America Vol. 5 #0–29 (2017–2018)
Superman
Supergirl: Rebirth (2016)
Supergirl Vol. 7 #1–20 (with Jody Houser: #15–18, 20), (with Vita Ayala: #19), 2016–2018)
Superman Giant #11, #14 (2019)
The Kamandi Challenge #6 (2017)
DC Rebirth Holiday Special (2017)
Kirby 100: The Sandman Special (2017)
Martian Manhunter
Martian Manhunter / Marvin the Martian (with Frank J. Barbiere, 2017)
Martian Manhunter Vol. 5 #1–12 (2018–2020)
Wonder Woman
Wonder Woman Vol. 5 #51–#55, #73, #82-#83 (2018–2020)
Wonder Woman Vol. 1 #750–758 (2020)
Wonder Woman Annual Vol. 5 #3–#4 (2019,2020)
DC Nuclear Winter Special (2018)
Electric Warriors #1–6 (2018–2019)
Milk Wars
Milk Wars: Doom Patrol/JLA (with Gerard Way, 2018)
Milk Wars: JLA/Doom Patrol (with Gerard Way, 2018)
The Unexpected Vol. 2 #1–8 (2018)
Young Monsters in LoveVol 1 #1(2018)
Doom Patrol: Weight of Worlds #3 (with Gerard Way and Jeremy Lambert, 2019)
DC's Crimes of PassionVol 1 #1 (2020)
Tales from the Dark Multiverse: Crisis on Infinite Earths (2020)

TKO Studios 

 The Pull (2020)

Aftershock Comics
 "PROJECT PATRON" (With Phillip Kennedy Johnson, 2021)
 "KILL A MAN" (With Phillip Kennedy Johnson, 2020)
 "S.O.S. Save Our Shops" (2020)
 "Dead Kings" #1–5 (2018–2019)

Heavy Metal
 Starward (2021)
 String Theory (2021)

215 Ink
 The Kitchen Witch (2021)

Boom Studios
 Mighty Morphin' Power Rangers #0–12 "Bulk and Skull" (2015–2016)
 Namesake #1–4 (2017)

Image Comics
 Commanders in Crisis #1–12 (2020–2021)
 Crude #1–6 (2018)
 Virgil (2015)
 Undertow #1–6 (2014)
Outlaw Territory Vol. 1 #1 (2009)
 Outlaw Territory Vol. 3 #1 (2013)

Dynamite Entertainment
 The Shadow/Batman  #1–6 (2017–2018)

IDW Publishing
 Love is Love (2017)
 Transformers: King Grimlock (2021)

Hello Mr.
 Hello Mr. #7 (2017)

House Spirit Press
 The Liberator (2018)

Poseur Ink
 Side B: A Music Lover's Anthology (2009)

Awards and nominations

Awards
2015 Broken Frontier Award for Best New Series for Midnighter.
2018 Tor Books Best Comics of 2018 for Martian Manhunter.

Nominations
2017 GLAAD Media Award for Outstanding Comic Book for Midnighter/Midnighter and Apollo
2015 All-Comic Award for Best New Series for Midnighter.
2014 Eisner Award for Best Anthology for Outlaw Territory Volume 3
2014 Harvey Award for Best Anthology for Outlaw Territory Volume 3

References

External links

1985 births
Living people
American comics writers
Writers from Syracuse, New York
Bisexual men
LGBT comics creators
Jewish American writers
American writers of Italian descent
American writers of Russian descent
American science fiction writers
21st-century American Jews
American bisexual writers